The Safeco Classic (often styled as the SAFECO Classic) was a women's professional golf tournament on the LPGA Tour in the Seattle area, sponsored by Safeco Insurance. It was played 18 times, from 1982 to 1999, at Meridian Valley Country Club in Kent, Washington, usually in mid-September, the week following the Safeway Classic in Portland.

With the opening of the Seattle Mariners' Safeco Field in Seattle in July 1999, Safeco entered a 20-year, $40 million agreement for the naming rights of the new major league baseball stadium. Safeco ended its sponsorship of the LPGA event in October 1999 and a new sponsor did not emerge.

Multiple winners of the 72-hole event were Patty Sheehan (1982, 1990, 1995), Juli Inkster (1983, 1988), and Karrie Webb (1995, 1996).

Winners

References

External links
Meridian Valley Country Club

Former LPGA Tour events
Sports competitions in Seattle
Golf in Washington (state)
History of women in Washington (state)